The Belfast Bible College is a private theological and Christian training college situated on the outskirts of Belfast, Northern Ireland.

The college offers a full range of courses in Theology. Courses are delivered in partnership with both the University of Cumbria and Queen's University Belfast. The Belfast Bible College is also a constituent college of the Institute of Theology at Queen's University Belfast. Following Queen's decision to end the validating of programmes through the institute from 2019, as a result degrees are awarded just by Cumbria.

The College does not belong to any single denomination but is a community drawn from 20 different denominations and 25 different countries.

History 
The college was established in 1943 as the Belfast Bible School and Missionary Training Home. It moved to its present site, Glenburn House in 1983. At the time, the college had just 35 full-time students.

The 2011 graduation took place in St. Annes Cathedral, Belfast, in attendance was the Lord Mayor of Belfast.

Courses

Undergraduate 
BA (Hons) Theology

HE Cert Theology

Postgraduate 
Graduate Diploma

MA Theology

Academics 
Entry requirements to undergraduate courses are typically two grades at 'C' or above at A-Level. Entry requirements for the Graduate Diploma are typically an undergraduate degree graded 2.2 or higher as well as one year of active engagement in some form of Christian Ministry. Applicants to the MA Theology programme must typically achieve an undergraduate honours degree classed as 2.1 or above in any subject. They must also have "a reasonable amount of experience in serving in Christian Ministry." All courses can be studied both full- and part-time.

Principals
James Burnett has now succeeded Helen Warnock as principal of Belfast Bible College who had, in turn, succeeded Dr. Patrick Mitchel as Principal in 2016, Dr Mitchel had been principal from August 2015. Rev Dr. Ian Dickson was appointed principal in 2011. David Shepard served as principal from 2005 until 2011. Victor Reid served as principal form 1972 until 1988. R. J. Taylor served as principal of Belfast Bible School in its early years.

References

External links
 
 Queens University Belfast Theology Official site

Bible colleges, seminaries and theological colleges in Northern Ireland
Queen's University Belfast
University of Cumbria